Monkstown is a settlement in Newfoundland and Labrador. Monkstown is approximately 110 km northeast of Marystown.

The town gave its family name to a type of dory - the "Monkstown Dory"

References

Populated places in Newfoundland and Labrador